Sal Hamid (also Romanized as Şāl Ḩamīd; also known as Şāleḩ Ḩamīd) is a village in Tang-e Haft Rural District, Papi District, Khorramabad County, Lorestan Province, Iran. At the 2006 census, its population was 35, in 8 families.

References 

Towns and villages in Khorramabad County